Cooks Gardens is a multi-purpose stadium in Wanganui, New Zealand.  It is currently used mostly for rugby union matches, athletics and cycling. The main stadium, known as Westpac Stadium, is able to hold 20,700 people with 3,500 covered seats.

History
Cooks Gardens use as a sporting facility commenced in 1896. Since then Cooks Gardens has been the venue of a number of the world's historic sporting occasions. One of these occasions was on 27 January 1962 when tens of thousands of spectators crammed into Cooks Gardens to witness athlete Peter Snell break the world record for the mile. Since then, the four minute mile has been broken 63 times at Cooks Gardens by 41 athletes from various countries around the world.

In 1996 a multimillion-dollar re-development of Cooks Gardens took place. This included an all-weather synthetic 400m athletic track, the first wooden cycling velodrome in New Zealand, and a new grandstand. Redevelopment of Cooks Gardens was completed in 2004 with the construction of two further grandstands.

The ground was also used for cricket from the 1890s until the 1990s. Central Districts used it as one of their home grounds from the 1950s to the 1990s, staging 17 first-class and eight List A matches there. A women's Test match was held there in February 1992, when New Zealand played England.

Features
 Cooks Gardens Event Centre is the hub of Cooks Gardens and contains the playing field and athletics track and has a capacity of 20,700 with 3,500 covered seats in the grandstands. The stadium hosts all Wanganui Heartland Championship home rugby matches. Many National and International athletic meets are held at Cooks Gardens.
 The Velodrome contains a 250m wooden track and has hosted several International cycling meets.
 The Function Centre contains a bar and kitchen facilities.

Notable people
Peter Snell, 1962 World record

References

External links

https://www.sporty.co.nz/wanganuicycling/Track/History
Cooks Gardens

1896 establishments in New Zealand
Rugby union stadiums in New Zealand
Sport in Whanganui
Multi-purpose stadiums in New Zealand
Cricket grounds in New Zealand
Defunct cricket grounds in New Zealand
Sports venues in Manawatū-Whanganui